The Stern Conservatory (Stern'sches Konservatorium) was a private music school in Berlin with many distinguished tutors and alumni. The school is now part of Berlin University of the Arts.

History 
It was founded in 1850 as the Berliner Musikschule by Julius Stern, Theodor Kullak and Adolf Bernhard Marx. Kullak withdrew from the conservatory in 1855 in order to create a new academy of sculpture and three-dimensional art. With Marx's withdrawal in 1856, the conservatory came exclusively under the Stern family and adopted its name. In 1894 it was taken over by Gustav Hollaender (the uncle of film composer Friedrich Hollaender), who moved the school's location to the Berlin Philharmonic concert hall on Bernburger Strasse in Berlin-Kreuzberg.

In the course of the Gleichschaltung process, the Stern Academy in 1936 was renamed Konservatorium der Reichshauptstadt Berlin controlled by the Nazi regime. Gustav Hollaender's heirs were disseized, but for a few years they were able to run a "Jewish Private Music School Hollaender" until they were deported and murdered in 1941.

In 1945, the school was again renamed as the Städtisches Konservatorium (City Conservatory) in what was to become West Berlin. In 1966 it was merged with the public Akademische Hochschule für Musik into the Staatliche Hochschule für Musik und Darstellende Kunst (Berlin State School of Music and the Performing Arts), since 2001 the Berlin University of the Arts.

Directors
 1883–1894: Jenny Meyer
 1894–1915: Gustav Hollaender
 1915–1930: Alexander von Fielitz
 1930–1933: Paul Graener
 1933–1935: Siegfried Eberhardt
Konservatorium der Reichshauptstadt Berlin:
 1936–1945: Bruno Kittel
Städtisches Konservatorium:
 1946–1949: Heinz Tiessen
 1950–1960: Hans Joachim Moser

Professors
 1854–1864 Hans von Bülow
 1855- ?: Ferdinand Laub
 1864–1871: Rudolf Radecke
 1866–1869: Friedrich Kiel
 1867–1878: Eduard Franck
 1874–1877: Arnold Krug
 1884–1885: Georg Wilhelm Rauchenecker
 1890–1897: Friedrich Gernsheim
 1897–1903: Hans Pfitzner
 1884–1906(?): Georg von Petersenn
 mind. 1896–1911: Martin Krause
 1897–1904: Ernst Jedliczka
 1898–1905: Ernst Eduard Taubert
 1898–1900: David Maurice Levett
 1904–1906: Sandra Drouker
 1906–1915: Leo Portnoff
 1900–1920: Engelbert Humperdinck
 1902–1903 and 1911: Arnold Schoenberg
 1904–1924: Arthur Willner
 mind. 1919–1929: Rudolf Maria Breithaupt
 1934–1940, 1962–1966: Konrad Wölki
 1935–1960: Conrad Hansen
 Herbert Ahlendorf
 Wilhelm Klatte
 James Kwast
 Max Löwengard
 Paul Lutzenko
 Selma Nicklass-Kempner
 Gustav Pohl
 Nikolaus Rothmühl
 Else Schmitz-Gohr
 Victor Hollaender
 Leopold Schmidt
 Robert Lösch
 1992–2012: David Friedman
 Mayer-Mahr. (1932)

Distinguished students
 1860–1862: Hermann Goetz
 1884– ? : Bruno Walter
1887-1976 Bertha Tideman-Wijers
1891–1894: Ernst Mielck
 1892–1894: Alberto Nepomuceno
 1896: Edwin Fischer
 1899–1902 Selmar Jacobson (Janson)
 1901–1979: Mischa Portnoff, composer and pianist
 1902–1903: Melitta Lewin
 1903–1907: Emil Honigberger
 1903–1906: Charles Griffes
 1905: Otto Klemperer
 1906–? : Marek Weber
 1906–1908: Manuel Ponce
 1906–1909: Clara Abramowitz, soprano
 1908–1913: Boris Kroyt, violinist and violist
 1909–1911: Max Nivelli
 1910–1913: Efim Schachmeister, violinist
 1912–1917: Meta Seinemeyer
1913-1914: Gustaf Nordqvist
 1913–1915: Margarete Krämer-Bergau
 1913–1918: Claudio Arrau
 1914–1924: Friedrich Löwe
 1915–1920: Lisy Fischer, pianist
 1920– ? : İzzet Nezih Albayrak, violinist
 1920s: Else Schmitz-Gohr, composer and pianist
 1924–1926: Marc Lavry
 1924–1929: Kees van Baaren
 1924–1929: Karl Ristenpart
 1925- ?: Nadia Friedlander, German/British artist
 1930–1935: Ruth Schönthal
 1946–1952: Hans-Wilfrid Schulze-Margraf
 1956–1965: Christian Schmidt
 ? –1936: Haim Alexander
 ? –1933: Manfred Bukofzer
 Robert Christian Bachmann
 Siegfried Eberhardt, violinist
 Issy Geiger
 Asparukh Leschnikoff, tenor
 Estelle Liebling, soprano and voice teacher
 Moritz Moszkowski
 Josef Plaut
 Heinrich Reimers, pianist
 Willi Sommerfeld
 Frieda Hempel
Else Streit, composer
 Fred Werner

The Marc Lavry Heritage Foundation.

Music schools in Germany
Educational institutions established in 1850
Arts organizations established in 1850
1850 establishments in Prussia
1850 establishments in Germany
Berlin University of the Arts